Thomas Harrison (1555, London – 1631) was an English Puritan scholar, a Vice-Master of Trinity College, Cambridge, and one of the translators for the King James Version of the Bible.

Life
He was born in London, and entered Merchant Taylors' School in 1570; he entered Trinity College, Cambridge, in 1573 and graduated B.A. in 1577. At Cambridge his scholarship attracted the notice of William Whitaker. He became a Fellow and tutor of Trinity College.

Harrison was a puritan, and in 1589 is mentioned as attending a synod at St. John's College, along with Thomas Cartwright. He was a noted Christian Hebraist and among the revisers of the King James Bible.  He belonged to the First Cambridge Company. For the last twenty years of his life he was vice-prefect of Trinity College.

He died in 1631 and was buried with some pomp in the chapel of his college. A Latin volume in his honour was written by Caleb Dalechamp (Dalecampius) and dedicated to John Bois; it is titled Harrisonus Honoratus: Id est Honorifica de Vita, &c. (Cambridge, 1632), and contains a meagre outline of his life in the form of a funeral oration, with some Latin verses to his memory.

References
 McClure, Alexander. (1858) The Translators Revived: A Biographical Memoir of the Authors of the English Version of the Holy Bible. Mobile, Alabama: R. E. Publications (republished by the Marantha Bible Society, 1984 ASIN B0006YJPI8 )
Nicolson, Adam. (2003) God's Secretaries: The Making of the King James Bible. New York: HarperCollins

Notes

Attribution

1555 births
1631 deaths
Writers from London
Fellows of Trinity College, Cambridge
16th-century Puritans
17th-century English Puritans
Translators of the King James Version
Christian Hebraists
17th-century English translators
Alumni of Trinity College, Cambridge